Kampung Gajah (Jawi: كامڤوڠ ڬاجه) is a town and mukim in Perak Tengah District, Perak, Malaysia.

Geography
The mukim has a population of 7,693 people and spans over an area of 59.57 km2.

The mukim is also home to Perak's 11th highest peak (1522m), Gunung Jelak, which is home to a small Kelantanese-Javanese population.

Administration
Kampung Gajah is also an autonomous sub-district (daerah kecil). The autonomous sub-district of Kampung Gajah also includes the historical town of Pasir Salak, as well as the nearby communes of Pulau Tiga, Kota Setia and Bandar.

References

Populated places in Perak
Perak Tengah District
Mukims of Perak